Abacination is a form of corporal punishment or torture, in which the victim is blinded by infliction of intentional damage to the eyes. Damage can be in the form of removal of the eyes or eyelids, slitting the eyes, burning, excessive pressure, chemical burns, nerve injury, or brain damage. In one account, a corrosive chemical, typically slaked lime, was contained in a pair of cups with decaying bottoms, e.g., of paper. The cups were strapped in place over the prisoner's eyes as they were bound in a chair. The slowly draining corrosive agent from the cups eventually ate away at the eyeballs.

History
Blinding as punishment has existed since antiquity, and is documented as a form of torture in ancient Persia, Greece, and the Byzantine Empire. Known accounts of abacination include John IV Laskaris (inflicted by Michael VIII Palaiologos), Alexios Mosele (by Constantine VI), and Constantine VI (by his mother, Irene of Athens).

See also
 Blinding (punishment)
 Eye for an eye

References

Physical torture techniques
Blindness
Eye injury
Mutilation